Manfredini is an Italian surname. Notable people with the surname include:

Aparicio Méndez (1904–1988), Uruguayan politician, birth name Aparicio Mėndez Manfredini
Christian Manfredini (born 1975), Côte d'Ivoire-Italian footballer
Elisabetta Manfredini-Guarmani (1780–after 1828), Italian opera singer
Fernando Salinas Manfredini (born 1956), Chilean activist
Francesco Manfredini (1684–1762), Italian Baroque composer, violinist, and church musician
Harry Manfredini (born 1943), US musician
Niccolò Manfredini (born 1988), Italian footballer
Pedro Manfredini (1935–2019), Argentine footballer
Renato Russo (1960–1996), Brazilian musician, birth name Renato Manfredini, Jr. 
Thomas Manfredini (born 1980), Italian footballer
Vincenzo Manfredini (1737–1799), Italian composer, harpsichordist and music theorist
Manfredini family of painters (Cremona) from the 18th and 19th centuries, included father Giovanni (1730–90), and his three sons, Paolo, (1754–1805), Giuseppe, and Serafino

See also
Memorial Argo Manfredini, an Italian tennis tournament

Italian-language surnames